Ahmed Rufai Abubakar  is a  Nigerian diplomat, and the current director general of Nigeria's -  National Intelligence Agency.

Awards
In October 2022, a Nigerian national honour of Commander of the Order of the Federal Republic (CFR) was conferred on him by President Muhammadu Buhari.

References

Nigerian diplomats
Year of birth missing (living people)
Living people